Bengaluru  Metropolitan Region Development Authority (BMRDA) is an autonomous body created by the Government of Karnataka under the BMRDA Act 1985 for the purpose of planning, co-ordinating and supervising the proper and orderly development of the areas within the Bangalore Metropolitan Region (BMR) which comprises Bangalore Urban district, Bangalore Rural district and Ramanagara District. Bangalore has also emerged as India's fifth largest metropolitan city by population (also the third largest city proper by population). Unlike the Bangalore Development Authority (BDA), the BMRDA does not have the power to acquire land.

Chairmanship 
BMRDA is headed by the Chief Minister of Karnataka as chairman and the Minister for Urban Development as vice-chairman; with various development agencies in Bangalore, senior officers and heads of departments as members. The Metropolitan Commissioner is the member secretary. BMRDA plays a leading role in the evolution of urban development policies in the Bangalore Metropolitan Region and is expected to act as an umbrella organization for the planning authorities setup in the region.

Jurisdiction 

BMRDA has its jurisdiction over the districts of Bangalore Urban, Bangalore Rural and Ramanagara.

Area Planning Zones 

The Area Planning Zones (APZs) are areas where urban development is permitted subject to certain regulations. Interstitial Zones (IZs) are the areas lying between the APZs; here, urban activities are restricted, giving more emphasis to environmental issues like conservation of forested areas, agriculture, etc. For planned urban growth, local planning areas under Karnataka Town & Country Planning Act, 1961, are declared in the five APZs and IZs 1 & 2. The following are the planning/ development authorities functioning in the Bangalore Metropolitan Region (BMR):

	Bangalore Development Authority [BDA]
	Bangalore Mysore Infrastructure Corridor Area Planning Authority [BMICAPA]
	Ramanagara Channapattana Urban Development Authority [RCUDA]
	Anekal Planning Authority [APA]
	Nelamangala Planning Authority [NPA]
	Magadi Planning Authority [MPA]	
	Hosakote Planning Authority [HPA]
	Kanakapura Planning Authority [KPA]
	Doddaballapura Planning Authority [DPA]
	Bangalore International Airport Area Planning Authority [BIAAPA]
	Area Planning Zone - 1 [APZ-1] (Excluding RCUDA & BMICAPA)	
	All Interstitial Zones in Bangalore Metropolitan Region [IZs - BMR]

References

External links 
 BMRDA Website

Economy of Bangalore
State urban development authorities of India
Government of Bangalore
State agencies of Karnataka